The 2016–17 Louisiana Tech Bulldogs basketball team represented Louisiana Tech University during the 2016–17 NCAA Division I men's basketball season. The Bulldogs, led by second-year head coach Eric Konkol, played their home games at the Thomas Assembly Center in Ruston, Louisiana and were members of Conference USA. They finished the season 23–10, 14–4 in C-USA play to finish in second place. They beat UAB in the quarterfinals of the C-USA Tournament before losing to Marshall in the semifinals. Despite finishing with 23 wins, the school declined to participate in a postseason tournament marking the first time since 2013 that they did not participate in a postseason tournament.

Previous season 
The Bulldogs finished the 2015–16 season 23–10, 12–6 in C-USA play to finish in three-way tie for third place. They lost in the quarterfinals of the C-USA tournament to Old Dominion. They received an invitation to the inaugural Vegas 16 where they lost in the quarterfinals to East Tennessee State.

Preseason 
The Bulldogs were picked to finish in seventh place in the preseason Conference USA poll. Erik McCree was selected to the preseason All-Conference USA team.

Departures

Incoming Transfers

Recruiting class of 2016

Recruiting class of 2017

Roster

Schedule and results

|-
!colspan=9 style=| Exhibition

|-
!colspan=9 style=| Non-conference regular season

|-
!colspan=12 style=| Conference USA regular season

|-
!colspan=9 style=| Conference USA tournament

References

Louisiana Tech Bulldogs basketball seasons
Louisiana Tech
Louisiana Tech Bulldogs men's b
Louisiana Tech Bulldogs men's b